Caleb Hemmer (born July 22, 1981) is an American politician from Tennessee. He is a Democrat and represents District 59 in the Tennessee House of Representatives.

Hemmer attended the University of Tennessee, where he earned a Bachelor of Science degree, before attending Tennessee Tech, where he earned a Master of Business Administration degree. He was first elected to the State House in 2022.

Hemmer lives in Nashville.

References 

Living people
Tennessee Democrats
Members of the Tennessee House of Representatives
21st-century American politicians
1981 births